A bouillon cube  (Canada and US),  stock cube (Australia, Ireland, New Zealand, South Africa and UK), or broth cube (Asia) is dehydrated broth or stock formed into a small cube or other cuboid shape. It is typically made from dehydrated vegetables or meat stock, a small portion of fat, MSG, salt, and seasonings, shaped into a small cube. Vegetarian and vegan types are also made. Bouillon is also available in granular, powdered, liquid, and paste forms.

History

Dehydrated meat stock, in the form of tablets, was known in the 17th century to English food writer Anne Blencowe, who died in 1718, and elsewhere as early as 1735. Various French cooks in the early 19th century (Lefesse, Massué, and Martin) tried to patent bouillon cubes and tablets, but were turned down for lack of originality. Nicolas Appert also proposed such dehydrated bouillon in 1831.

Portable soup was a kind of dehydrated food used in the 18th and 19th centuries. It was a precursor of meat extract and bouillon cubes, and of industrially dehydrated food. It is also known as pocket soup or veal glue. It is a cousin of the glace de viande of French cooking. It was long a staple of seamen and explorers, for it would keep for many months or even years. In this context, it was a filling and nutritious dish. Portable soup of less extended vintage was, according to the 1881 Household Cyclopedia,
"exceedingly convenient for private families, for by putting one of the cakes in a saucepan with about a quart of water, and a little salt, a basin of good broth may be made in a few minutes."

In the mid-19th century, German chemist Justus von Liebig developed meat extract, but it was more expensive than bouillon cubes.

The invention of the bouillon cube is also attributed to Auguste Escoffier, one of the most accomplished French chefs of his time, who also pioneered many other advances in food preservation, such as the canning of tomatoes and vegetables.

Industrially produced bouillon cubes were commercialized by Maggi in 1908, by Oxo in 1910, and by Knorr in 1912. By 1913, at least 10 brands were available, with salt contents of 59–72%.

Ingredients
The ingredients vary between manufacturers and may change from time to time. Typically, the ingredients consists  of salt, hydrogenated fat, monosodium glutamate, flavor enhancers, and flavors.

Maggi bouillon cubes are manufactured from iodized salt, hydrogenated palm oil, wheat flour, flavor enhancers (monosodium glutamate, disodium inosinate, disodium guanylate), chicken fat, chicken meat, sugar, caramel, yeast extract, onion, spices (turmeric, white pepper, coriander), parsley.

Production process

Stock cubes are made by mixing already dry ingredients into a paste. The ingredients are usually mixed in a container (batch mixing), left to mature, and then shaped into the cube form. Alternatively, they can be mixed directly into an extruder.

See also

 List of dried foods
 Portable soup
 Instant dashi

References

Food ingredients
Dried foods
Convenience foods
Umami enhancers